Voltaic Revolutionary Communist Party (PCRV) is a communist party in Burkina Faso. It was founded on 1 October 1978, following a split in the Voltaic Communist Organization (OCV).

The PCRV follows the political line of the now defunct Albanian Party of Labour, an anti-revisionist variant of Marxism-Leninism which came to be known as Hoxhaism. It promoted a "national democratic and popular revolution" (RNDP).

The 1983 Upper Voltan coup d'état elevated Thomas Sankara to power. At that time, the PCRV had powerful links in the trade unions and student movements. The party, however, refused to participate in Sankara's revolutionary government, arguing that a military coup was not the same as a popular revolution. In 1984, it again refused to participate in the government during a cabinet reshuffle. This led to a split and the formation of the Burkinabé Communist Group.

The PCRV is a participant in the International Conference of Marxist–Leninist Parties and Organizations (Unity & Struggle) or ICMLPO.

The party publishes Bug-Parga.

References

External links

Communist parties in Burkina Faso
International Conference of Marxist–Leninist Parties and Organizations (Unity & Struggle)
Anti-revisionist organizations
Stalinist parties
Hoxhaist parties
Clandestine groups
Political parties established in 1978
Political parties in Burkina Faso